Fabio Calabria (born 27 August 1987 in Canberra) is an Australian cyclist, who last rode for UCI Professional Continental team . In 2014, Calabria finished eighth at the Bucks County Classic, 57 seconds behind winner Zachary Bell.

References

External links

1987 births
Living people
Australian male cyclists
Sportspeople from Canberra